Carlos Ricardo Benavides Jiménez (born in Puntarenas on August 29, 1969) is a Costa Rican lawyer, businessman and politician. He has served as the President of the Legislative Assembly of Costa Rica between 2019 and 2020. He is currently serving as a Deputy of Legislative Assembly of Costa Rica representing the San José Province. Benavides holds a Law degree and public notary from the University of Costa Rica.

Career 
Benavides has served as a deputy in Legislative Assembly of Costa Rica for two different terms between 2002-2006 and 2018-2022 respectively. He was President of the World Tourism Organization between 2008 and 2010, Minister of Tourism from 2006 to 2011 covering the administrations of Óscar Arias Sánchez and Laura Chinchilla, then Minister of the Presidency in the remaining period of the Chinchilla administration from 2011 to 2014.

References 

Living people
1969 births
People from Puntarenas Province
20th-century Costa Rican lawyers
Costa Rican politicians
National Liberation Party (Costa Rica) politicians